Green Blue Fire is an album by Lida Husik and Beaumont Hannant. It was released in 1996 through Astralwerks.

Conception
The album was inspired by Husik's travels in York, England.

Critical reception
The Washington Post called the album "wispy, neo-psychedelic electronic music." Trouser Press called it "by turns stark, still and catchy." CMJ New Music Monthly called Green Blue Fire "chill-out ambient folk—groovy at times, dull at others."

Track listing

Personnel
Richard Brown – keyboards, percussion, production, engineering
Beaumont Hannant – keyboards, percussion, production, engineering
Wendi Horowitz – design
Lida Husik – vocals, guitar, keyboards, photography

References

1995 albums
Astralwerks albums
Lida Husik albums